Gustavo Kuerten defeated Andre Agassi in the final, 6–4, 6–4, 6–4 to win the singles tennis title at the 2000 Tennis Masters Cup. With the win, Kuerten became the year-end No. 1, and became the first South American to make the achievement.

Pete Sampras was the defending champion, but was defeated in the semifinals by Kuerten.

Seeds

Alternate

Draw

Finals

Red group
Standings are determined by: 1. number of wins; 2. number of matches; 3. in two-players-ties, head-to-head records; 4. in three-players-ties, percentage of sets won, or of games won; 5. steering-committee decision.

Green group
Standings are determined by: 1. number of wins; 2. number of matches; 3. in two-players-ties, head-to-head records; 4. in three-players-ties, percentage of sets won, or of games won; 5. steering-committee decision.

See also
ATP World Tour Finals appearances

External links
 Draw

Singles
Tennis tournaments in Portugal
Sports competitions in Lisbon
2000 in Portuguese tennis
December 2000 sports events in Europe
2000s in Lisbon
November 2000 sports events in Europe